The following highways are numbered 509:

Ireland

  R509 road (Ireland)

United Kingdom

  A509 road (England)
  A509 road (Northern Ireland)

United States